Lawrence Stephen (died 22 March 2006) was a political figure from the Pacific nation of Nauru.

Political role
Lawrence Stephen served as a Member of the Parliament of Nauru from 1971 to 1977.

He subsequently served a second period as a Member of Parliament from 1980 to 1986, as well as a third period from 1992 to 1995.

Role in sport
He was involved for many years with the Nauru National Olympic Committee, and served as its General Secretary.

Family

One of Nauru's aspiring sportsmen during this period was his son Marcus Stephen who became a champion weightlifter, before embarking on a political career. He became President of Nauru in 2007.

Death
Stephen died on 22 March 2006.

See also
 Politics of Nauru
 Political families of the world#Nauru

References

Members of the Parliament of Nauru
People from Anetan District
1939 births
2006 deaths
20th-century Nauruan politicians